Ivan Efremov (born 9 March 1986) is an Uzbekistani heavyweight weightlifter. He competed at the 2012 and 2016 Olympics and placed fifth in the −105 kg division on both occasions. Efremov is an ethnic Russian. He is married to Daria and has a daughter named Ulyana.
Following disqualifications of other competitors, in 2020 Efremov was allocated the Olympic bronze medal for the 105kg lift at the 2012 Olympics.

References

External links
 
 
 
 

1986 births
Living people
Sportspeople from Tashkent
Uzbekistani male weightlifters
Olympic weightlifters of Uzbekistan
Weightlifters at the 2012 Summer Olympics
Weightlifters at the 2016 Summer Olympics
Asian Games medalists in weightlifting
Weightlifters at the 2010 Asian Games
Weightlifters at the 2014 Asian Games
Asian Games silver medalists for Uzbekistan
Medalists at the 2010 Asian Games
World Weightlifting Championships medalists
Islamic Solidarity Games medalists in weightlifting
20th-century Uzbekistani people
21st-century Uzbekistani people